Dagskrá was the first newspaper published in Iceland, first published in 1896 in Reykjavík. It continued to be published until 1899 as a weekly paper. Einar Benediktsson was the owner of the paper, which supported the policy of Heimastjórnarflokkurinn.

(See Í.A. 1990: 272)

References

 Íslenska Alfræðiorðabókin A-G. 1990. Editors: Dóra Hafsteinsdóttir and Sigríður Harðardóttir. Örn og Örlygur hf., Reykjavík.

1896 establishments in Iceland
Mass media in Reykjavík
Defunct newspapers published in Iceland
Defunct weekly newspapers
Weekly newspapers published in Iceland
Publications established in 1896